Disha Madan is an Indian  actress and social media personality. She is known for her works in Kannada-language television shows and films. She is also famous on the social media platform TikTok.

Career 
Disha Madan made her television debut with the first season of Dancing Star and won the season title along with Tsunami Kitty in 2014. She also played the role of Vachana in the soap opera Kulavadhu before leaving the show to help her father with his business. On musical.ly, she was the first Indian to have a million followers. She has 2.6 million followers as of July 2018. In 2018, she was set to star in the web series Hate You Romeo with Aravinnd Iyer, which is yet to release. In 2020, she starred in the movieFrench Biriyani as a news reporter. She also bagged a role in the web series sequel to Humble Politician Nograj.

Personal life 
She is married to Shashank Vasuki Gopal and they have a son named Vian Shashank Vasuki, born on 27 July 2019 and a daughter named Avira Vasuki, born on 1 March 2022. .

Filmography

Television

References 

Living people
21st-century Indian women
21st-century Indian people
Indian TikTokers
Actresses in Kannada cinema
Year of birth missing (living people)